The 2002 Campeonato Nacional Clausura Copa Banco del Estado was the 72nd Chilean League top flight tournament. 

The champion was Colo-Colo which won its twenty fourth league title during its bankruptcy, so it was the first Chilean champion in this status.

Qualifying stage

Scores

Standings

Group A

Group B

Group C

Group D

Playoff stage

Finals

Top goalscorers

Pre-Copa Libertadores play-off

Cobreloa also qualified for the 2003 Copa Libertadores

References

External links
RSSSF Chile 2002

Primera División de Chile seasons
Chile
2002 in Chilean football